Sphegina  lobulifera  (Malloch 1922), the Black-lobed Pufftail , is an rare species of syrphid fly observed in eastern North America.. Hoverflies can remain nearly motionless in flight. The  adults are also  known as flower flies since they are commonly found on flowers from which they get both energy-giving nectar and protein rich pollen. Larvae are found in accumulations of decaying sap under bark, usually in wet situations such as damp, shaded woodland and in partially submerged wood in streams and pools.

References

Eristalinae
Insects described in 1922
Diptera of North America
Taxa named by John Russell Malloch